Cresselly Cricket Club Ground is a cricket ground in Cresselly, Pembrokeshire.  The first recorded match on the ground was in 1979, when Welsh Schools played Irish Schools.  In 2007, Glamorgan played a single List-A match at the ground against Surrey.

In local domestic cricket, Cresselly Cricket Club Ground is the home ground of Cresselly Cricket Club.

References

External links
Cresselly Cricket Club Ground on CricketArchive
Cresselly Cricket Club Ground on Cricinfo

Cricket grounds in Wales
Sport in Pembrokeshire
Sports venues in Pembrokeshire
Glamorgan County Cricket Club